Settler society is a theoretical term in the early modern period and modern history that describes a common link between modern, predominantly European, attempts to permanently settle in other areas of the world. It is used to distinguish settler colonies from resource extraction colonies. The term came to wide use in the 1970s as part of the discourse on decolonization, particularly to describe older colonial units.

Examples 
One of the earliest examples of settler society was the Kingdom of Jerusalem, which was established by Crusaders and lasted for almost 200 years. It constituted a localized feudal hierarchy established by the Franks, who ruled and exploited the territory according to their political and economic interests. The European colonization of the Americas resulted in the establishment of several settler societies, while Australia was also established as a series of settler societies by European settlers during the colonization of Australia during the 19th century.

Province of men 
As a traditional model of comparative analysis, it has been described as the means by which white male settlers "heroically" conquered a land and established democracies of one sort or another. This particular conceptualization has been criticized for ignoring issues such as race, ethnicity, and gender. However, it is noted that while the concept of settler society is structured along traditional gender lines, female settlers enjoyed favorable competitive position in comparison to their counterparts in the metropole. For instance, a colonial administrator's wife or a female teacher was able to attain wider social recognition in settler societies.

References

Bibliography
Sherene H. Razack Race, space, and the law: Unmapping a white settler society Toronto, Ontario: Between the Lines, 2002
D Pearson, "Theorizing citizenship in British settler societies" Ethnic and Racial Studies, 2002.

1970s neologisms
Settler colonialism
Settlers